Redemption (Redemptionheart on physical editions) is the fourth studio album by American singer Dawn Richard, which was released on November 18, 2016, by Local Action / Our Dawn Entertainment.

Redemption serves as the final chapter in a trilogy, following 2013's Goldenheart and 2015's Blackheart. The album features contributions from Noisecastle III as well as New Orleans natives Trombone Shorty and PJ Morton.

Background 

REDEMPTION is the final installment in a planned trilogy of albums by Richard, referred to as The Heart Trilogy, about love, loss, and redemption. The album is preceded by 2013's Goldenheart and 2015's Blackheart.

Richard describes the album as a "self-realization" album that is for all people. She says, "The Red Era is for everybody. Every gay, every fluid, every black, every white. Because my fan base has been through a lot of shit."

None of the previously released singles "Dance", "Not Above That", "Wake Up" and "Cali Sun" can be found on the final track-listing.

Promotion 
On March 12, 2016 D∆WN started her REDEMPTION Live show tour. In that same year, she was also chosen to perform the first ever YouTube live 360 performance.

Critical reception

Upon its release, Redemption received widespread acclaim from critics. Tara Joshi of The Quietus stated, "It's orchestral, it's odd, it's experimental, it's ornate, it makes you want to dance, it makes you want to swoon - at its heart Redemption is reflective of so many touchstones of black music from the past 30 years or so. It feels odd to say what Richard is doing is still perhaps too niche to get her a place in the R&B 'Hot 100', given her sound is so broad and all-encompassing, but its true. Richard has carved out an ambitiously futuristic place for herself that the mainstream hasn't quite caught up with yet."

Accolades

Track listing

Release history

References

External links 
 

2016 albums
Concept albums
Dawn Richard (singer) albums